The Senate Armed Services Subcommittee on Personnel is one of seven subcommittees within the Senate Armed Services Committee.

Jurisdiction
The Personnel Subcommittee has jurisdiction over all matters relating to active and reserve military personnel, including pay rates, military health care and education benefits, Morale, Welfare and Recreation services, and military justice. The subcommittee also oversees issues related to prisoners of war and military personnel who are missing in action.

Members, 118th Congress

Historical subcommittee rosters

117th Congress

116th Congress

115th Congress

114th Congress

See also
U.S. House Armed Services Subcommittee on Military Personnel

Notes

External links
Senate Armed Services Committee home page
Senate Armed Services Committee subcommittee list and membership page

Armed Services Senate Personnel